Chorion-specific transcription factor GCMa is a protein that, in humans, is encoded by the GCM1 gene.

This gene encodes a DNA-binding protein with a gcm-motif (glial cell missing motif). The encoded protein is a homolog of the Drosophila glial cells missing gene (gcm). This protein binds to the GCM-motif (A/G)CCCGCAT, a novel sequence among known targets of DNA-binding proteins. The N-terminal DNA-binding domain confers the unique DNA-binding activity of this protein.

References

Further reading